Giovanni Luis Soto (born May 18, 1991) is a Puerto Rican former professional baseball pitcher. He played for the Cleveland Indians of Major League Baseball in 2015 and for the Puerto Rican national baseball team in the 2013 and 2017 World Baseball Classics.

Career

Detroit Tigers
Soto attended Advanced Central College High School in Carolina, Puerto Rico. The Detroit Tigers selected Soto in the 21st round of the 2009 MLB draft.

Cleveland Indians
In 2010, the Tigers traded Soto to the Cleveland Indians for Jhonny Peralta. On July 15, 2012, while playing for the Akron Aeros, Soto pitched a no-hitter against the Altoona Curve.

The Indians invited Soto to spring training as a non-roster invitee in 2013. He also played for the Puerto Rican national baseball team in the 2013 World Baseball Classic where they lost to the Dominican Republic national baseball team in the championship game 3-0.

In 2015, Soto pitched for the Columbus Clippers of the Class AAA International League. Soto appeared in 46 games for Columbus, going 2-1 with a 2.68 ERA while striking out 51 in 53.2 innings. Following the conclusion of the Triple-A season, the Indians purchased Soto's contract on September 4, 2015 and added him to the major-league roster. Soto made his debut the next day against Detroit, retiring Tyler Collins on a single pitch, the only batter he faced. Soto made 6 appearances for Cleveland down the stretch, not giving up a run in 3.1 innings.

Chicago Cubs
On April 11, 2016, the Indians traded Soto to the Chicago Cubs for cash considerations, with Kyle Schwarber being transferred to the 60-day disabled list to make room on the roster. Soto spent 2016 with the Triple-A Iowa Cubs, where he posted a 1-3 record with a 5.14 ERA in 33 appearances. On October 22, Soto was designated for assignment, once again trading places on the roster with Schwarber as he was making an unexpected attempt to return to the Cubs during the postseason.

Oakland Athletics
On October 26, 2016, Soto was claimed off waivers by the Oakland Athletics.

Chicago White Sox
On November 7, 2016, Soto was claimed off waivers by the Chicago White Sox. He was released on June 9, 2017.

Road Warriors
Soto signed with the Road Warriors of the Atlantic League of Professional Baseball for the 2018 season. He became a free agent following the 2018 season.

New Britain Bees
On April 16, 2019, Soto signed with the New Britain Bees of the Atlantic League of Professional Baseball. Following the season, his rights were acquired by the Sugar Land Skeeters in the New Britain Bees dispersal draft.

On February 14, 2020, Soto's contract was purchased by the Diablos Rojos del México of the Mexican League. In 2020, he did not play a game because of the cancellation of the Mexican League season due to the COVID-19 pandemic and later became a free agent. After the 2020 season, he played for Criollos de Caguas of the Liga de Béisbol Profesional Roberto Clemente(LBPRC). He has also played for Puerto Rico in the 2021 Caribbean Series.

See also
 List of Major League Baseball players from Puerto Rico

References

External links

1991 births
Living people
Akron Aeros players
Akron RubberDucks players
Arizona League Indians players
Baseball players at the 2019 Pan American Games
Columbus Clippers players
Criollos de Caguas players
Gigantes de Carolina players
Cleveland Indians players
Gulf Coast Tigers players
Iowa Cubs players
Kinston Indians players
Lake County Captains players
Liga de Béisbol Profesional Roberto Clemente pitchers
Lobos de Arecibo players
Major League Baseball players from Puerto Rico
Major League Baseball pitchers
Medalists at the 2019 Pan American Games
New Britain Bees players
Pan American Games gold medalists for Puerto Rico
Pan American Games medalists in baseball
People from Carolina, Puerto Rico
Senadores de San Juan players
West Michigan Whitecaps players
2013 World Baseball Classic players
2017 World Baseball Classic players